Ram Island is a small  island off the coast of Mystic, Connecticut.
Once called Mystic Island, it was formerly the site of an exclusive Victorian era hotel resort at which steamships from Boston and New York City stopped twice a day. At the height of its popularity, the hotel played host to a world lightweight bare-knuckle boxing championship. By the 1920s, the hotel had fallen into disrepair and was destroyed in the New England Hurricane of 1938. A motel was later built that catered to transient boaters.

The island has served as a seasonal private residence and farm since 1978. However, fires in February 2013 and March 2014 destroyed the barn and home.

See also

 The village of Noank, Connecticut is the nearest inhabited land, and also home to the namesake Ram Island Yacht Club.
 Mason's Island, Enders Island, North Dumpling Island, and Fishers Island, New York are nearby inhabited islands.

References

External links
 . Retrieved 2008-05-02.

Stonington, Connecticut
Landforms of New London County, Connecticut
Coastal islands of Connecticut
Private islands of Connecticut
Long Island Sound